Smooth may refer to:

Mathematics
 Smooth function, a function that is infinitely differentiable; used in calculus and topology
 Smooth manifold, a differentiable manifold for which all the transition maps are smooth functions
 Smooth algebraic variety, an algebraic variety with no singular points
 Smooth number, a number whose prime factors are all less than a certain value; used in applications of number theory
 Smoothsort, a sorting algorithm

Arts and entertainment

Music
 Smooth (singer), Juanita Stokes, American singer, rapper and actress
 Smooth (album), by Smooth, 1995
 Smooth, an album by Gerald Albright, 1994
 "Smooth" (Florida Georgia Line song), 2017
 "Smooth" (iiO song), 2004
 "Smooth" (Santana song), featuring Rob Thomas, 1999
 "Smooth", a mashup by Neil Cicierega from Mouth Moods, 2017

Other media
 Smooth (magazine), an American publication for young black men
 Smooth Radio (disambiguation), UK radio station networks
 smoothfm, an Australian radio network
 Foxtel Smooth, a defunct Australian pay-television music channel

See also
 Smooth Island (disambiguation)
 
 
 Smoother (disambiguation)
 Smoothing (disambiguation)